Agelasta postvittata is a species of beetle in the family Cerambycidae. It was described by Stephan von Breuning in 1939. It is known from India.

References

postvittata
Beetles described in 1939